Wallin, alternatively Wahlin, is a surname of Swedish origin and may refer to:

 Alfred Wallin (1836–1923), American judge  
 Bianca Wallin (1909–2006), Swedish artist
 Christer Wallin, former freestyle swimmer from Sweden
 Carl E. Wallin (1879-1968), Swedish-American artist
 Carl Georg August Wallin (1893-1978), Swedish artist (mariner painter)
 David Wallin (1876–1957), Swedish artist
 Elisabeth Ohlson Wallin, Swedish photographer and an artist
 Georg August Wallin (1811–1852), Finnish orientalist
 Harald Wallin (1887–1946), Swedish sailor who competed in the 1908 Summer Olympics 
 Homer N. Wallin (1893–1984), Vice Admiral in the United States Navy
 J. E. Wallace Wallin (1876–1969), American psychologist and author
 Jesse Wallin, retired Canadian professional ice hockey defenceman 
 Johan Olof Wallin (1779-1839),  Swedish minister, orator, poet and Archbishop of Uppsala Sweden.
 Lars Wallin, Swedish fashion designer
 Lotta Wahlin, Swedish professional golfer
 Magdalena Forsberg (born as Magdalena Wallin), Swedish cross-country skier and biathlete
 Magnus Wallin, Swedish video artist
 Niclas Wallin, Swedish professional ice hockey player
 Nils Wallin (1904–1987), Swedish canoer who competed in the 1936 Summer Olympics  
Otto Wallin, Swedish professional boxer  
 Pamela Wallin, former Canadian television journalist and diplomat
 Per Henrik Wallin (1946- 2005) Swedish jazz pianist and composer. 
 Peter Wallin, professional ice hockey player who played in the National Hockey 
 Rickard Wallin, Swedish professional ice hockey centre 
 Rolf Wallin, Norwegian composer, trumpeter and avant-garde performance artist
 Samuel Wallin (1856–1917), U.S. Representative from New York 
 Stefan Wallin, Finnish minister in Matti Vanhanen's Cabinet
 Wallin Family, American family of traditional ballad singers

See also
 Wollin
 Wolin

Swedish-language surnames